Founded in 1967, BC Housing is a provincial Crown agency under the Ministry of Attorney General and Minister responsible for Housing, that develops, manages and administers a wide range of subsidized housing options across the province. It is located in Burnaby, British Columbia, Canada. They license residential builders, administer owner builder authorizations and carry out research and education that benefits the residential construction industry, consumers and the affordable housing sector.

Licensing & Consumer Services
Licensing & Consumer Services (Licensing, previously known as the Homeowner Protection Office) is a branch of BC Housing. It is responsible for licensing residential builders and building envelope renovators province-wide; administering Owner Builder Authorizations; and carrying out research and education which benefits the residential construction industry and consumers.

Licensing & Consumer Services serves buyers of new homes and people arranging for new homes to be built, homeowners (particularly owners of homes covered by home warranty insurance), developers, residential builders, building envelope renovators and owner builders. In undertaking its activities they also works closely with warranty providers, building officials, industry and related consumer associations, all levels of government, educational institutions, research organizations, architects, engineers, property managers, the legal community and the real estate community.

Licensing & Consumer Services was formed as a response to the need to create basic consumer protections for buyers of new homes. The Homeowner Protection Act which passed on July 28, 1998 for the main purposes of strengthening consumer protection for buyers of new homes and improving the quality of residential construction in the province. The Act provided for the creation of Licensing & Consumer Services and officially opened on October 1, 1998.

History
On February 12, 2018, the CBC shared the following story: "No questions asked at new refuges for homeless youth" - Three homes in East Vancouver hope to help teens get off the streets.

On February 11, 2018, The Vancouver Sun ran the following story: "Vancouver unveils Marpole temporary modular housing" - The units in the modular apartment building set to open in Marpole this month are small, just 250 sq. feet, but each will offer a homeless person their own small kitchen and bathroom with a shower stall.

On January 12, 2018, CTV Vancouver shared the following story: "3 new modular housing sites announced for Surrey's homeless" - The B.C. government and the City of Surrey have announced plans for three new modular housing projects for Surrey's homeless residents.

On September 10, 2012 the CBC showed the following headlines: "Public housing in Vancouver called 'crack shacks and brothels' - CEO admits filthy, crime-ridden buildings in 'abysmal' shape".

References

External links
BC Housing - official site
Licensing & Consumer Services - Official Site
Homeowner Protection Act
Homeowner Protection Act Regulation

Crown corporations of British Columbia
Public housing in Canada